François Arnaud (Comtat-Venaissin, 27 July 1721 – 2 December 1784) was a French clergyman, writer, and philologist.

Biography 
From 1766, he directed la Gazette. A friend of Suard, he also attended the salons of Mme Necker and Mlle Lespinasse. Through Mlle Lespinasse's support he was elected to the Académie française on 11 April 1771 and was received into it by Châteaubrun on 13 May, making the subject of his reception speech On the character of ancient languages compared to the French language. The same year he was admitted to the Académie des Inscriptions. He collaborated with Fréron and, alongside Suard, led the Gluckists in their quarrel with the Piccinnists. His collected works amount to 3 volumes.

References

External links
Academie-francaise biography
 

People from Carpentras
1721 births
1784 deaths
French classical scholars
French librarians
French philologists
18th-century French writers
18th-century French male writers
18th-century French journalists
Members of the Académie Française
Members of the Académie des Inscriptions et Belles-Lettres
French male non-fiction writers